Ibi or IBI may refer to:

Companies
 IBI Group, a Canadian-based architecture, engineering, planning, and technology firm

Places
 Ibi, Nigeria, a town and administrative district in Taraba State, central Nigeria
 Ibi, Spain, a town in the province of Alicante, Spain
 Ibi District, Gifu in Japan
 Ibi River, a river in Japan
 Ibi, Burkina Faso

People
 Qakare Ibi, an ancient Egyptian ruler
 Ibi (Egyptian Noble)
 Sinibaldo Ibi, an Italian painter
 Ibi Kaslik, a Hungarian-Canadian novelist and journalist
 Ibrahim Afellay, a Dutch-Moroccan football player nicknamed 'Ibi'

Science
 Index of Biological Integrity, a scientific tool used to identify and classify water pollution problems.

Other
Ibi people, a Timucuan-speaking people that lived in what is now the U.S. state of Georgia
I.B.I (band), a South Korean girl group.

Acronyms
 Imperial Bank of India, now the State Bank of India since 1955
 Index of biological integrity, in biology or ecology, an indicator of the health of a watershed.
 Information Based Indicia, an electronic postage system used by the United States Postal Service
 Information Builders Inc., makers of FOCUS WebFocus and Iway Software
 Inquiry-based instruction, teaching method posing questions, problems or scenarios, rather than simply presenting established facts or portraying a smooth path to knowledge
 Interbeat interval
 International Boat Industry, UK based business marine magazine
 International Bowling Industry, a ten-pin bowling magazine
 International Business Initiatives, an economic development firm in Arlington, Virginia.
 Irish Bible Institute, an evangelical bible college in Dublin, Ireland

See also
Ibis (disambiguation)